Madjidi Ndikumana (born 8 February 1976 in Bujumbura) is a Burundian defender who played with Light Stars FC in the Seychelles League.

Career
He signs in January 2005 with Light Stars FC, he was transferred from Prince Louis FC, formerly presented  Rayon Sport. He presented his homeland on international level from 1998 between 2003.

External links
 

1976 births
Living people
Burundian footballers
Burundi international footballers
Association football defenders
Burundian expatriate footballers
Burundian expatriate sportspeople in Rwanda
Burundian expatriate sportspeople in Seychelles
Expatriate footballers in Seychelles
Expatriate footballers in Rwanda
Rayon Sports F.C. players
Light Stars FC players
Prince Louis FC players